Karelsprivilege is a legendary privilege that Charlemagne allegedly paid to the Frisians led by Magnus Forteman to thank them for the support that was given to his attack on Rome. Since the 13th century, the Frisians regularly mentioned  in legal and historical works. The authenticity of the privilege has been heavily contested, especially after the Middle Ages. The privilege formed the basis of the so-called Frisian freedom. It was recognized as genuine by a number of Holy Roman emperors. An affirmation and recognition of the privilege was given by Emperor Conrad II in 1039.

The original has been lost. According to tradition it was inscribed on the wall of a church, which could be the church of Almenum, Ferwoude or Oldeboorn. Copies were made and circulated during the Middle Ages. Some or all of these copies were likely forgeries.

In the Middle Ages, only the original, and undamaged sealing wax impressions, were accepted as valid. Forged documents were common, and a well-organized archive of treaty documents that could serve as a reference did not exist. This is unclear because in the time of Charlemagne there were no family or regional coat of arms existing, but it could have been used as a banner in that period.

Background
Between 650 and 750 the Franks significantly expanded their realm. At that time they conquered a large part of Frisia. That conquest was not complete. The part already conquered remained in unsettled ownership (see the death of Boniface). Frisia east of the Lauwers, together with Saxony, continued to oppose the Franks.

Only Charlemagne eventually succeeded, in breaking the last resistance by the Saxons in 785. The Saxons were led by Widukind and were beaten during the Saxon Wars. To what extent this led to the imposition of law on the Frisians is unknown.

The core of the privilege would have been that this freedom was returned to the Frisians. The obligations the Lex said the Frisian received the freedom to apply those rights, but not that they were forced to do so.

Meaning
Although the existence of the privilege has been challenged, the Frisian Countries up to the beginning of the sixteenth century developed in a unique way, without the feudal system introduced by Charlemagne in other areas of Western Europe.

Bibliography
 Friesche Almanac 1892 (beware, PDF of 7.3 Mb)

Literature
 A. Janse, De waarheid van een falsum. Op zoek naar de politieke context van het Karelsprivilege , De Vrije Fries, (The truth of a falsehood. Looking at the political context of the Karelsprivilege, in The Free Frisian), volume LXXI (1991) p7-28
 T. van der Laars, Wapens, vlaggen en zegels van Nederland, (weapons, flags and seals in the Netherlands), Amsterdam (1913), reprint 1989, pp 57–60.

History of Friesland
History of Groningen (province)
Medieval law